James Francis Mbatia (born 10 June 1964) is a Tanzanian NCCR–Mageuzi politician and a nominated Member of Parliament since 2012.

References

1964 births
Living people
NCCR–Mageuzi MPs
Tanzanian MPs 2010–2015
Nominated Tanzanian MPs
Tambaza Secondary School alumni